Mast Mauli is a Indian Hindi soap opera staring Shagun Singh, Shawar Ali and Mohit Sonkar. The show was premiered 23 January 2023, and it was aired on Dangal TV under the banner of Mandala Talkies production. This show is the remake of the Gemini TV's Telugu television series Pournami.

Plot
Mahendra Pratap Singh, A famous Thakur lives with his wife Sudha and his family in Varanasi. One Day, Sudha gets pregnant with Mahendra's child and she birth her daughter but however she died due to the birth of her daughter which makes Mahendra blames her daughter for his wife's death and which makes him to dislike her. But however, her aunt raised the child and named her as Mauli.

18 years later 
Mauli, a beautiful and well-raised women, is now grown up. But till now her father Mahendra hates and blames her for his first wife's death. Mauli lives with her grandmother, stepmother, who try their best to reunite Mauli and father. Mauli craves the love and attention from her father.

Cast 
 Shagun Singh as Mauli Mahendra Singh; Mahendra and Sudha's daughter, Rajkumari's adoptive daughter, Bihaan's love interest (2023 - present)
 Shawar Ali as Mahendra Pratap Singh; Sudha's widower, Rajkumari second husband, Mauli's father (2023 - present)
 Rani Chatterjee as Rajkumari Mahendra Singh; Mahendra's second wife; Mauli's adoptive mother (2023 - present)
 Mohit Sonkar as Bihaan; Mauli's love interest (2023 - present)
 Prachi Pathak as Mauli's aunt (2023 - present)
 Hardika Joshi as Sudha Mahendra Singh; Mahendra's first wife, Mauli's mother (2023)(Dead)
 Akshita Arora as Daadi; Mahendra's mother, Mauli's grandmother, Sudha and Rajkumari's mother-in-law (2023 - present) 
 Navneet Srivastava as Vihaan's friend (2023 - present)
 Krishnakant Singh Bundela as Pandit (2023)
Aashish Singh as Rohan
Neetu Sangla as Preeti
Shivanshi Das as Bharkha;Bihan's friend

Cameo appearances
 Sonal Khilwani as Bindiya Abhay Bharadwaj from Bindiya Sarkaar (2023)

Production

Casting
Shagun Singh and Mohit Sonkar were signed as the lead.

Rani Chatterjee is cast to portray a negative role.

Development
The series was announced by Mandala Talkies for Dangal TV in December 2022.

Release
The promos featuring the leads was released in January 2023.Show was Released in January 23.

Adaptations

See also
List of programmes broadcast by Dangal TV

References

External links 

Mast Mauli on Dangal Play 
2023 Indian television series debuts
Hindi-language television shows
Indian television soap operas
Dangal TV original programming